= Çevirmen =

Çevirmen is an object-oriented machine translation system designed to translate English text files to Turkish in an interactive environment.
